The 1897–98 City Cup was the fourth edition of the City Cup, a cup competition in Irish football.

The tournament was won by Linfield for the third time.

Group standings

References

1897–98 in Irish association football